Toni Mangold is a West German bobsledder who competed in the late 1970s. He won a bronze medal in the two-man event at the 1979 FIBT World Championships in Königssee.

References
Bobsleigh two-man world championship medalists since 1931

German male bobsledders
Living people
Year of birth missing (living people)